Mattino cinque is an Italian infotainment television program. It airs every morning, from Monday to Friday, on Canale 5 and reruns on Mediaset Plus. It is produced in collaboration with Videonews.

References

Mediaset
Infotainment
Italian television talk shows
2008 Italian television series debuts
2000s Italian television series
2010s Italian television series
Canale 5 original programming